Mateus Cardoso Lemos Martins (born 15 February 2000), commonly known as Tetê, is a Brazilian professional footballer who plays as an attacking midfielder or winger for Premier League club Leicester City, on loan from Ukrainian Premier League club Shakhtar Donetsk.

Club career

Early career
Born in Alvorada, Rio Grande do Sul, Tetê joined the youth academy of Grêmio in 2008. In 2016, he scored 33 goals for the reserves. On 20 April 2018, his contract was extended until 2021.

Shakhtar Donetsk
On 20 February 2019, Tetê moved abroad and joined Ukrainian club Shakhtar Donetsk. On 13 April, he made his first team debut in a 3–0 league victory against Zorya Luhansk. On 6 November, he scored his first Champions League goal in a 3–3 away draw against Dinamo Zagreb in the 2019–20 season.

On 21 October 2020, Tetê scored the opening goal and provided one assist in Shakhtar's memorable 3–2 victory away to Real Madrid in the group stage of the UEFA Champions League.

Loans
On 7 March 2022, FIFA announced that, due to the Russian invasion of Ukraine, all the contracts of foreign players in Ukraine are suspended until 30 June 2022 and they are allowed to sign with clubs outside Ukraine until that day. On 31 March 2022, Tetê used the new rule to join Lyon in France until the end of June 2022. The arrangement was repeated for the 2022–23 season as FIFA has extended the system for another year.

On 29 January 2023, Tetê signed for Premier League side Leicester City on loan until June 2023. On 4 February 2023, he scored on his debut for Leicester City in a 4–2 win against Aston Villa in the Premier League.

International career
Tetê has represented the under-20 team at the 2019 South American U-20 Championship. In 2018 he was called up to train with the senior Brazil team, but he did not make a senior debut.

Career statistics

Honours
Shakhtar Donetsk
 Ukrainian Premier League: 2018–19, 2019–20
 Ukrainian Cup: 2018–19
 Ukrainian Super Cup: 2021

References

External links
 

2000 births
Living people
Brazilian footballers
FC Shakhtar Donetsk players
Olympique Lyonnais players
Leicester City F.C. players
Ukrainian Premier League players
Ligue 1 players
Association football wingers
Brazil youth international footballers
Brazilian expatriate footballers
Brazilian expatriate sportspeople in Ukraine
Expatriate footballers in Ukraine
Brazilian expatriate sportspeople in France
Expatriate footballers in France
Brazilian expatriate sportspeople in England
Expatriate footballers in England
Grêmio Foot-Ball Porto Alegrense players